The Taipei Metro Haishan station is a station on the Bannan line located in Tucheng District, New Taipei City, Taiwan.

Station layout

The two-level, underground station with an island platform and three exits. It is located close to Mingde Rd. and Yuming Rd.

History
31 May 2006: The station opened as part of a western extension to Yongning.

Construction
The station is 200 meters long and 21 meters side. Initially, the proposed site was too narrow to construct a station. Thus, the neighboring Gongguan drain was changed into an underground drainage box. The station was constructed on top of the drain between National Haishan Industrial Vocational High School and Leli Elementary School.

Public art
Public art for the station is titled "Farm" and is located in the public square outside the station. It consists of 11 cows of differing sizes and forms which also act as street furniture. The painted ponds on the ground were created with the help of teachers and students from the nearby Leli Elementary School.

Exits
Exit 1: Behind the Leli Elementary School
Exit 2: Beside the sports ground of Haishan I.V. High School 
Exit 3: Alley 6, Lane 21, Yumin Rd. (Adjacent to Yumin Rd.)

Around the station
Haishan Industrial Vocational High School
Leli Elementary School
Guangfu Elementary School
Zhongzheng Junior High School
Huorao Market
Tucheng Gymnasium

References

Railway stations opened in 2006
Bannan line stations